Jameh Shuran (also Romanized as Jāmeh Shūrān; also known as Jamaishūrāu and Jameh Shūrā’ū) is a village in Panjeh Ali Rural District, in the Central District of Qorveh County, Kurdistan Province, Iran. At the 2006 census, its population was 320, in 77 families. The village is populated by Kurds.

References 

Towns and villages in Qorveh County
Kurdish settlements in Kurdistan Province